Zak Devin Boggs (born December 25, 1986 in Marietta, Ohio) is an American soccer player.

Career

College and amateur
Boggs grew up in Vienna, West Virginia, and attended Parkersburg High School before transferring to IMG Academy in Bradenton, Florida. He played college soccer at West Virginia University, the University of Central Florida and the University of South Florida, where he was named to the Big East All-Tournament Team, earned All-Big East Third Team honors, was named Big East Male Scholar-Athlete of the Year, and was named to the ESPN The Magazine Academic All-America and All-District teams as a junior.

During his college years Boggs also played for six seasons with the Bradenton Academics in the USL Premier Development League, scoring 49 goals in 80 appearances.

Professional
Boggs was drafted in the second round (31st overall) of the 2010 MLS SuperDraft by the New England Revolution.

He made his professional debut on March 27, 2010, in New England's opening game of the 2010 MLS season against the Los Angeles Galaxy. On May 8, 2010, Boggs made his first MLS start and scored his first two goals in the Revs' 3-2 loss to the Columbus Crew.

Boggs signed a new contract with New England on March 2, 2011.

On August 10, 2012, Boggs announced his departure from the Revolution to accept a Fulbright scholarship to study at Leicester University.

Boggs returned to professional soccer in March 2014 when he signed with Charlotte Eagles of USL PRO.

Boggs signed with Tampa Bay Rowdies of the North American Soccer League in February 2015. He was released by Tampa Bay in November 2015.

On January 6, 2016, Boggs and Rowdies teammate Corey Hertzog joined the Pittsburgh Riverhounds.

Personal
Boggs graduated from the University of South Florida with a degree in biomedical sciences. He was nominated as a Rhodes scholar.
Boggs completed an MS degree in marketing from the University of South Florida in 2010. In 2012, Boggs received a Fulbright Scholarship to study cancer cell and molecular biology at the University of Leicester in Leicester, UK. Boggs attended The Ohio State University College of Medicine and earned his medical degree in May 2021. He completed his intern year of general surgery at The Mount Carmel Health Systems in Columbus, Ohio. He is set to start his Interventional Radiology residency at University of South Florida on July 1, 2021 in Tampa, Florida.

Honors

Individual
MLS Humanitarian of the Year Award (1): 2011

References

External links
 
 UCF biography
 USF biography

1986 births
Living people
American soccer players
West Virginia Mountaineers men's soccer players
UCF Knights men's soccer players
South Florida Bulls men's soccer players
IMG Academy Bradenton players
New England Revolution players
Barrow Town F.C. players
Charlotte Eagles players
Tampa Bay Rowdies players
Parkersburg High School alumni
Sportspeople from Marietta, Ohio
People from Vienna, West Virginia
Soccer players from West Virginia
University of South Florida alumni
USL League Two players
Major League Soccer players
USL Championship players
North American Soccer League players
New England Revolution draft picks
Pittsburgh Riverhounds SC players
Association football forwards
Association football midfielders
East Midlands Counties Football League players
Fulbright alumni